Leanderthal Lady is the skeletal remains of a prehistoric woman discovered in January 1983 by the Texas Department of Transportation at the Wilson-Leonard Brushy Creek Site (an ancient Native American campsite) in the city of Leander, Texas, a suburb of Austin, the state capital. The remains were also alternatively labeled "Leanne". Both names were inspired by the proximity of the site to the town of Leander, to the north.

Analysis
Carbon dating and stratigraphic analysis showed the remains to be 10,000 to 13,000 years old. The find was significant as one of the oldest and most complete human skeleton finds in North America.

See also
List of unsolved deaths

References

External links
Leanne's Burial

1983 archaeological discoveries
1983 in Texas
Oldest human remains in the Americas
People from Cedar Park, Texas
People from Leander, Texas
Unsolved deaths in the United States
Williamson County, Texas